The Californian is a 1937 American Western film directed by Gus Meins and written by Gordon Newell and Gilbert Wright. The film stars Ricardo Cortez, Marjorie Weaver, Katherine DeMille, Maurice Black, Morgan Wallace and Nigel De Brulier. The film was released on July 18, 1937, by 20th Century Fox.

Plot
The story follows Ramon Escobar who comes back to California after attending school in Spain, and finds corrupt politicians mistreating the people of California.

Cast   
Ricardo Cortez as Ramon Escobar
Marjorie Weaver as Rosalia Miller
Katherine DeMille as Chata
Maurice Black as Pancho
Morgan Wallace as Tod Barsto
Nigel De Brulier as Don Francisco Escobar
George Regas as Ruiz
Pierre Watkin as Miller 
James Farley as Sheriff Stanton 
Edward Keane as Marshal Morse
Gene Reynolds as Ramon as a Child
Ann Gillis as Rosalia as a Child 
Francisco Flores del Campo as Ruiz as a Child
Billy Bletcher as Tax Collector

References

External links 
 

1937 films
20th Century Fox films
American Western (genre) films
1937 Western (genre) films
Films directed by Gus Meins
American black-and-white films
Films produced by Sol Lesser
1930s English-language films
1930s American films